Holgate may refer to:

People with the surname
 Christine Holgate, Australian businesswoman
 Sir David John Holgate, English judge
 Edwin Holgate, Canadian artist
 Harry Holgate, Australian politician
 Laura Holgate, American diplomat
 Mason Holgate, English footballer
 Robert Holgate, former Archbishop of York
 Stephen Holgate, English rugby league player
 Thomas F. Holgate (1859-1945), American mathematician and academic administrator

Places
 Holgate, New South Wales, a suburb of the Australian Central Coast region
 Holgate, York, a suburb in England
 Holgate, a hamlet in the civil parish of New Forest, North Yorkshire, England
 Holgate, New Jersey, a community in Long Beach Township
 Holgate, Ohio

Other
Holgate School (disambiguation)
 Holgate (HBC vessel), operated by the HBC in 1916, see Hudson's Bay Company vessels